Urška Žigart  (born 4 December 1996) is a Slovenian professional racing cyclist, who currently rides for UCI Women's WorldTeam .

Career
In 2020, she won the Slovenian National Time Trial Championships and competed in the Tour de l'Ardeche and Giro Rosa.

In November 2020, Žigart signed a contract for the 2021 season with the  team, later renamed .

Personal life
Žigart is the partner of cyclist Tadej Pogačar, a two-time Tour de France winner.
They became engaged in September 2021.

Major results

2016
 3rd Time trial, National Road Championships
2017
 3rd Time trial, National Road Championships
2019
 National Road Championships
3rd Road race
3rd Time trial
2020
 National Road Championships
1st  Time trial
3rd Road race
2021
 1st Stage 4 Setmana Ciclista Valenciana
2022
 National Road Championships
1st  Time trial

See also
 List of 2015 UCI Women's Teams and riders

References

External links

 

1996 births
Living people
Slovenian female cyclists
People from Slovenska Bistrica